Corinne Raux, born 16 August 1976 at Combourg, is a French duathlete who was duathon world champion in 2002. She also practiced the marathon successfully, taking 15th in the 2004 Athens Olympic marathon.

Biography

Youth 
Corinne Raux began sport in schools and ran in her youth for an Athletics club.  She had some success, but focused on her studies and got a baccalaureate of science. She continued her studies and obtained a state diploma as a physiotherapist in 1998. Living in Savoy she naturally practiced mountain running, the VTT, but also the Duathlon where she had some success.

Career in duathlon 
After resuming sporting activities suspended by her student career, she began practicing Duathlon in 2000 and quickly joined the team of France.

In 2002, she won the ITU Duathlon World Championships in the United States.  This is her only victory in a global competition. She abandoned the duathlon in favor of Running which remains her main specialty.

Career in athletics 
Since 2003, Corinne Raux has chosen to focus solely on road racing.

In 2004 at the Paris marathon, which was her second marathon, Corinne Raux performed outstandingly taking a place on the podium and winning the third qualifying spot for 2004 Summer Olympics at Athens. She also becomes the third-best French performer at the distance, running 2:29:19 after Chantal Dallenbach and Maria Rebelo.  She participates in Athens and represents France with Rakkia Quétier-Marawi and Hafida Gadi.  In a marathon race marred by great heat, she takes 15th with a time of 2:34:54.

In 2005, she took 5th place in the Paris marathon with a time of 2:28:47, 20 seconds off the French record held by Chantal Dallenbach. She improved on that occasion her personal best by almost 30 seconds.  As in 2003, she also won the Marathon Bay of Mont Saint-Michel in 2005. She became the French marathon championship, for 2005 also.

Retirement 
With Masseuse and physiotherapist training, Corinne Raux, after many competitions and some injuries, stopped the practice of elite running. She resumed the practice of her masseuse profession, which she had put on hold for her competitive period. She is now focusing on the physical and mental preparation of athletes. She shares her knowledge and experience through her physiotherapy practice.

Awards and records

Record in duathlon 
The table shows the most significant results (podium) obtained in the national and international Duathlon circuit.

Record in athletics 
 2002
 Mountain Trail running champion of France
 2003
    winner of Bay of Mont Saint-Miche Marathon
 Champion of France in the Half Marathon
 2004
   3rd of Paris marathon
   14th the marathon Summer Olympics 2004
 2005
    winner Bay of Mont Saint-Michel Marathon
    Winner of the Corrida de langueux
   5th in the Paris Marathon

Personal Bests

Notes and references

External links 
 Olympic profile for Corinne Raux at sports-reference.com
 

1976 births
Living people
French female long-distance runners
French female marathon runners
Olympic athletes of France
Athletes (track and field) at the 2004 Summer Olympics
Sportspeople from Ille-et-Vilaine
Duathletes